Yaqut or Yāḳūt may refer to: 

 Yaqut al-Hamawi (1179–1229), Arab biographer and geographer of Greek origin
 Yaqut al-Musta'simi (died 1298), calligrapher and secretary of the last Abbasid caliph
 Jamal-ud-Din Yaqut (ca. 1200–1240), confidante of the first female monarch of the Delhi Sultanate in India